The Archangel is a 1969 Italian comedy film directed by Giorgio Capitani and starring Vittorio Gassman.

Cast
 Vittorio Gassman as Fulvio Bertuccia
 Pamela Tiffin as Gloria Bianchi
 Irina Demick as Sig.ra Tarocchi Roda
 Adolfo Celi as Marco Tarocchi Roda
 Laura Antonelli
 Carlo Baccarini
 Carlo Delle Piane
 Mario De Rosa
 Gioia Desideri
 Tom Felleghy as Fabris
 Antonio Guidi
 Corrado Olmi
 Carlo Pisacane
 Gianni Pulone
 
 Pippo Starnazza

References

External links

1969 films
Italian comedy films
1960s Italian-language films
1969 comedy films
Films directed by Giorgio Capitani
Films scored by Piero Umiliani
20th Century Fox films
1960s Italian films